I Never Once Stopped Loving You  is a fourteenth solo studio album by American country singer Connie Smith. It was released in September 1970 on RCA Victor and contained ten tracks. The collection mixed original material with covers of previously-recorded songs. Three singles were included on the album: "You and Your Sweet Love", the title track and "Louisiana Man". Both "You and Your Sweet Love" and the title track reached the top ten on the American country songs chart in 1970. The album itself charted in the top 20 of the American country LP's survey. Billboard magazine gave the LP a positive response following its original release.

Background
Connie Smith reached her peak success in the mid 1960s with a series of uninterrupted top ten country singles, beginning with 1964's "Once a Day". Despite becoming a Christian in 1968 and devoting more time to spiritual endeavors, Smith continued to regularly record for the RCA Victor label. Smith's singles made the top ten less regularly following 1968 but she continued having commercial success. After finishing her final recording sessions for a duet album with Nat Stuckey, Smith began working on material for next studio album which would be titled I Never Once Stopped Loving You. The album was described by Smith herself as a traditional country collection.

Recording and content
The recording sessions for I Never Once Stopped Loving You occurred over five sessions in 1970: February 3, February 4, March 6, March 18 and April 17. The only exception was the track "You and Your Sweet Love", which was pulled from a recording session in September 1969. The song was first included on Smith's compilation released in March 1970 titled The Best of Connie Smith Volume II. Four of the album's sessions were produced by Smith's longtime producer at RCA Victor, Bob Ferguson. However, the tracks "Louisiana Man" and "There's Something Lonely in This House" were produced by Ronny Light. He had previously produced sessions for Skeeter Davis and Waylon Jennings.

The album contained a total of ten tracks. "Think I'll Go Somewhere and Cry Myself to Sleep", "You and Your Sweet Love" and the title track were composed by Bill Anderson, whom had discovered Smith and written much of her early material. The title track also included writing credits from singer Jan Howard. Three tracks on the album were covers of previously-recorded country songs. Included was Charley Pride's number one single "(I'm So) Afraid of Losing You Again", Faron Young's number one single "Alone with You" and George Jones's top ten single "If My Heart Had Windows". Smith was first offered "If My Heart Had Windows" but she originally declined it. She later chose to record it for her 1970 album after Jones released his own version. "I do admit that it is hard to believe that I would turn down that song at all!" she recounted. As part of Smith's new Christian beliefs, she incorporated more gospel selections onto her country albums. Included on the album were two gospel tracks: a cover of the hymn "I'll Fly Away" and a new ballad called "The Son Shines Down on Me". The latter was written by Larry Lee, who was part of Johnny Cash's publishing company and wrote the liner notes for I Never Once Stopped Loving You.

Release and reception
I Never Once Stopped Loving You was released in September 1970 on the RCA Victor label. It was Smith's sixteenth studio album of her career and her fourteenth solo album (she recorded two as a duet team with Nat Stuckey). The disc was originally distributed as a vinyl LP, containing five songs on each side of the record. Decades later, the album was reissued to digital and streaming sites on the Sony Music Entertainment label. In its original release, Billboard magazine gave the LP a positive response, calling Smith "one of the most beautiful singers" in country music. The magazine highlighted the title track, "Louisiana Man", "The Sun Shines Down on Me" and "I'm So Afraid of Losing You Again". They concluded by saying, "You can expect strong sales from this LP." Biographer Barry Mazor also commenting positively on the project, finding it to be "one of her most consistent and strongest albums."

The album spent 11 weeks on the American Billboard Top Country Albums chart, peaking at number 15 in October 1970. It became Smith's sixth studio record to peak in the top 20. Included on the record were three singles. "You and Your Sweet Love" was first issued as a single by RCA Victor in October 1969 and peaked at number six on the Billboard Hot Country Songs chart in 1970. The title track was released as the next single in March 1970. The song became Smith's fourteenth top ten single on the Billboard country chart, peaking at number five. "Louisiana Man" was the third single included on the album and was first released by RCA Victor in August 1970. The single peaked at number 14 on the Billboard country chart, becoming her fourth song to place in the country top 20.

Track listings

Vinyl version

Digital version

Personnel
All credits are adapted from the liner notes of I Never Once Stopped Loving You and the biography booklet by Barry Mazor titled Just for What I Am.

Musical personnel
 Joseph Babcock – backing vocals
 David Briggs – piano
 Jerry Carrigan – drums
 James Crawford – steel guitar
 Bobby Dyson – electric bass
 Ray Edenton – rhythm guitar
 Dolores Edgin – backing vocals
 Hoyt Hawkins – backing vocals
 Buddy Harman – drums
 Junior Huskey – bass
 James Isbell – drums
 Grady Martin – electric guitar, leader
 Charlie McCoy – harmonica
 Neal Matthews – backing vocals

 Weldon Myrick – steel guitar
 June Page – backing vocals
 Dean Porter – guitar, leader
 Hargus "Pig" Robbins – piano
 Jerry Shook – rhythm guitar
 Billy Sanford – electric guitar
 Connie Smith – lead vocals
 Gordon Stoker – backing vocals
 Pete Wade – electric guitar 
 Bill Walker – organ, vibraphone
 Ray Walker – backing vocals
 Hurshel Wiginton – backing vocals
 Jerry Whitehurst – piano
 Chip Young – rhythm guitar

Technical personnel
 Jerry Bradley – producer (overdub session for Ronnie Light; March 16, 1971)
 Bob Ferguson – producer
 Larry Lee – liner notes
 Les Leverett – cover photo
 Ronny Light – producer 
 Al Pachucki – recording engineer
 Mike Shockley – recording technician
 Roy Shockley – recording technician
 Bill Vandevort – recording engineer

Chart performance

Release history

References

Footnotes

Books

 

1970 albums
Albums produced by Bob Ferguson (music)
Connie Smith albums
RCA Victor albums